Pan-American Korfball Championship is the korfball competition played by Pan-American national teams.

History

References

External links
International Korfball Federation

Korfball competitions
Recurring sporting events established in 2014